Bagautdin Umakhanov (born 2 June 1971 in Khasavyurt) is a Russian former wrestler who competed in the 1996 Summer Olympics.

References

1971 births
Living people
Olympic wrestlers of Russia
Wrestlers at the 1996 Summer Olympics
Russian male sport wrestlers
People from Khasavyurt
Sportspeople from Dagestan